Earl of Clarendon is a title that has been created twice in British history, in 1661 and 1776.

The family seat is Holywell House, near Swanmore, Hampshire.

First creation of the title 

The title was created for the first time in the Peerage of England in 1661 for the statesman Edward Hyde, 1st Baron Hyde. He was Chancellor of the Exchequer from 1643 to 1646 and Lord Chancellor from 1658 to 1667 and a close political adviser to Charles II, although he later fell out of favour and was forced into exile. Hyde had already been created Baron Hyde, of Hindon in the County of Wiltshire, in 1660, and was made Viscount Cornbury, in the County of Oxford, at the same time he was given the earldom. These titles were also in the Peerage of England. His second son Laurence Hyde was also a politician and was created Earl of Rochester in 1682. Lord Clarendon's daughter Anne Hyde married the future King James II and was the mother of Queen Mary II and Queen Anne.

Lord Clarendon was succeeded by his eldest son Henry, the second Earl. He was also a politician and served as Lord Privy Seal and Lord Lieutenant of Ireland. His son, the third Earl, represented Wiltshire and Christchurch in the House of Commons and served as Governor of New York, before succeeding to the earldom; he had married Katherine, 8th Baroness Clifton, but she died in New York before becoming Countess of Clarendon. Their only son Edward Hyde, Viscount Cornbury, succeeded his mother as ninth Baron Clifton in 1706; he died ten years before his father, unmarried. The only daughter Lady Theodosia succeeded her elder brother as tenth Baroness Clifton (see the Baron Clifton for later history of this title).

Lord Clarendon was succeeded by his first cousin Henry Hyde, 2nd Earl of Rochester, who became the fourth Earl of Clarendon; he was the only son of the first Earl of Rochester. He had earlier represented Launceston in the House of Commons and served as Lord Lieutenant of Cornwall. His only surviving son and heir apparent Henry Hyde, Viscount Cornbury, was summoned to the House of Lords through a writ of acceleration in his father's junior title of Baron Hyde in 1751. However, he died childless in April 1753, eight months before the death of his father. Consequently, on Lord Clarendon's death in December 1753 all the titles became extinct.

Second creation of the title
Lady Jane Hyde, eldest daughter of the fourth Earl of Clarendon, married William Capell, 3rd Earl of Essex. Their daughter Lady Charlotte Capell married the prominent diplomat and politician Thomas Villiers, second son of William Villiers, 2nd Earl of Jersey. Villiers was Envoy to Vienna and Berlin and served as Joint Postmaster General and as Chancellor of the Duchy of Lancaster. In 1748 he was made a Baron of the Kingdom of Prussia, an honour which he received Royal licence to use in Great Britain, and in 1756 the barony of Hyde held by his wife's ancestors was revived when he was raised to the Peerage of Great Britain as Baron Hyde, of Hindon in the County of Wiltshire. In 1776 the earldom of Clarendon was also revived when he was made Earl of Clarendon in the Peerage of Great Britain.

Lord Clarendon was succeeded by his eldest son, the second Earl. He sat as Member of Parliament for Christchurch and Helston. He never married and was succeeded by his younger brother, the third Earl. He represented several constituencies in the House of Commons and served as Comptroller of the Household between 1789 and 1790. He had one daughter but no sons and was succeeded by his nephew, the fourth Earl. He was the eldest son of George Villiers (1759–1827), third son of the first Earl. Known as the "Great Lord Clarendon", he was a prominent diplomat and Liberal politician. He was three times Foreign Secretary of the United Kingdom and also served as Lord Privy Seal, Chancellor of the Duchy of Lancaster, President of the Board of Trade and Lord Lieutenant of Ireland.

Lord Clarendon was succeeded by his second but eldest surviving son, the fifth Earl. In early life he briefly represented Brecon in the House of Commons as a Liberal but later joined the Conservative Party and held minor office from 1895 to 1905 under Lord Salisbury and Arthur Balfour. On his death the titles passed to his only son, the sixth Earl. He was a Conservative politician and served under Bonar Law and Stanley Baldwin as Captain of the Honourable Corps of Gentlemen-at-Arms and Under-Secretary of State for Dominion Affairs. He was later Governor-General of South Africa from 1931 to 1937. His grandson, George, the seventh Earl, who succeeded in 1955 died in July 2009. He was the only son of George Herbert Arthur Edward Hyde Villiers, Lord Hyde, who died in 1935. The title has passed to his son, George, eighth earl.

Several other members of this branch of the Villiers family have also gained distinction. Thomas Hyde Villiers, second son of George Villiers (third son of the first Earl), represented three constituencies in the House of Commons before his early death in 1832. His son Reverend Charles Villiers was the father of 1) Edward Cecil Villiers, a Rear-Admiral in the Royal Navy, whose son Sir Michael Villiers was a vice-admiral in the Royal Navy and Fourth Sea Lord from 1960 to 1963, and 2) Ernest Amherst Villiers, Liberal Member of Parliament for Brighton from 1906 to 1910. The successful businessman and racehorse owner Charles Villiers (born 1963) who co-founded the local newspaper company Score Press Limited, which was sold for £155 million in 2005, is the great-great-great grandson of the aforementioned Thomas Villiers MP. Charles Pelham Villiers, third son of George Villiers, was a prominent Liberal politician and served as President of the Poor Law Board (with a seat in the cabinet) from 1859 to 1866. Between 1890 and 1898 he was Father of the House of Commons.

The Conservative politician Theresa Villiers is the great-great-great-granddaughter of Edward Ernest Villiers, fourth son of George Villiers. Henry Montagu Villiers, fifth son of George Villiers, was Bishop of Durham from 1860 until his death the following year. Sir Francis Hyde Villiers, fourth and youngest son of the fourth Earl, was a diplomat and served as British Ambassador to Belgium from 1919 to 1920. His grandson was the actor James Villiers.

The family main home is Holywell House, Swanmore, Hampshire. The family's main home 1753-1923 was the largest of the three main manors of Watford, the Grove which is today a hotel in Sarratt (civil parish).

Earls of Clarendon, First creation (1661)
 Edward Hyde, 1st Earl of Clarendon (1609–1674)
 Henry Hyde, 2nd Earl of Clarendon (1638–1709)
 Edward Hyde, 3rd Earl of Clarendon (1661–1723)
Edward Hyde, Viscount Cornbury, 9th Baron Clifton (1691–1713)
 Henry Hyde, 4th Earl of Clarendon, 2nd Earl of Rochester (1672–1753)
Henry Hyde, Viscount Cornbury, 5th Baron Hyde (1710–1753)

Earls of Clarendon, Second creation (1776)
 Thomas Villiers, 1st Earl of Clarendon (1709–1786)
 Thomas Villiers, 2nd Earl of Clarendon (1753–1824)
 John Charles Villiers, 3rd Earl of Clarendon (1757–1838)
 George William Frederick Villiers, 4th Earl of Clarendon (1800–1870)
Edward Hyde Villiers, Lord Hyde (1845–1846)
 Edward Hyde Villiers, 5th Earl of Clarendon (1846–1914)
 George Herbert Hyde Villiers, 6th Earl of Clarendon (1877–1955)
George Herbert Arthur Edward Hyde Villiers, Lord Hyde (1906–1935)
 George Frederick Laurence Hyde Villiers, 7th Earl of Clarendon (1933–2009)
 George Edward Laurence Villiers, 8th Earl of Clarendon (b. 1976)

Present peer
George Edward Laurence Villiers, 8th Earl of Clarendon (born 12 February 1976) is the only son of the 7th Earl and his wife Jane Diana Dawson. He married Bryonie V. L. Leask, daughter of Major-General Anthony de Camborne Lowther Leask, while still styled as Lord Hyde. He was Page of Honour to Queen Elizabeth II in 1988. On 4 July 2009 he succeeded as Earl of Clarendon and Baron Hyde of Hindon. 
The heir apparent is the present holder's eldest son Edward George James Villiers, Lord Hyde (born 2008).

See also
Clarendon Palace
Earl of Jersey
Earl of Rochester
Sir Nicholas Hyde
Town Hall, Wootton Bassett

Bibliography
Catalogue of the Portraits in the Collection of the Earl of Clarendon, by Robin Gibson, Paul Mellon Centre, 1977

Notes

References

Kidd, Charles, Williamson, David (editors). Debrett's Peerage and Baronetage (1990 edition). New York: St Martin's Press, 1990,

External links
George Villiers, 8th Earl of Clarendon

Extinct earldoms in the Peerage of England
Earldoms in the Peerage of Great Britain
Noble titles created in 1661
Noble titles created in 1776

Earls of Clarendon
1661 establishments in England